Current Organic Chemistry is a scientific review journal summarizing progress in the fields of asymmetric synthesis, organo-metallic chemistry, bioorganic chemistry, heterocyclic chemistry, natural product chemistry and analytical methods in organic chemistry. The journal is currently being edited by Dr. György Keglevich.

Indexing information 
Current Organic Chemistry is indexed in the following databases:

 British Library
 Cabell's Directory
 Chemical Abstracts Service/SciFinder
 Chemistry Citation Index®
 ChemWeb
 CNKI Scholar
 Current Contents®/Physical, Chemical & Earth Sciences
 Dimensions
 EBSCO
 Engineering Village/Chimica
 ERA 2018
 Genamics JournalSeek
 Google Scholar
 InCites
 Index Copernicus
 J-Gate
 Journal Citation Reports/Science Edition
 JournalTOCs
 MediaFinder®-Standard Periodical Directory
 PubsHub
 QOAM
 Research Alert®
 Science Citation Index Expanded™ (SciSearch®)
 Scilit
 Scopus
 Suweco CZ
 TOC Premier
 Ulrich's Periodicals Directory

Organic chemistry journals
English-language journals
Bentham Science Publishers academic journals